Shaolin Prince aka Death Mask of the Ninja, Shaolin Death Mask, Iron Fingers of Death is a 1982 Hong Kong martial arts-action film released by Shaw Brothers and directed by Chia Tang. It is one of the Shaolin Temple themed martial arts films and featured Ti Lung, Derek Yee and Jason Pai Piao.

Plot 
The 9th Prince aka "Iron Fingers" wants the royal seal to become emperor. To get it he must kill the current emperor and his two new born sons elder brother Tao Hing and younger Wong Szu Tai, and their bodyguards Gu Long and Li Chin. Gu Long and Li Chin escapes with the boys and they end up separated, Tao Hing goes under the care of the "3 Holy Fools" at Shaolin temple and Szu Tai under the care of the Prime Minister (Ku Feng) and are unaware of each other's whereabouts or existence. Tao Hing is raised by the 3 Holy Fools who are forbidden to come out of their dwelling due to corruption in Shaolin Temple and learns the secret Yijin Jing, however he is naive and knows nothing of his lineage though he carries the royal seal. He constantly gets into fights with a traitorous monk who secretly works for the 9th Prince but bests him in every scuffle. Wong Szu Tai however being raised by the Prime Minister and Gu Long is well aware of the existence of his brother (though he does not know who he is), the evils of the 9th Prince, and getting revenge. Gu Long tells him the only way to beat the 9th Prince is to go to Shaolin and get the Yijin Jing. The 9th Prince hears of the existence of Wong Szu Tai and visits the Prime Minister. He attempts to test if Wong knows kung fu but Wong holds back as he realizes he cannot beat the 9th Prince.

After an arranged exorcism by monk Dao Kong goes haywire and leaves Tao Hing to fend for himself , a passing Wong Szu Tai rescues and befriends Tao Hung. Tao Hung offers to escort him to Shaolin which angers monk Dao Kong as they arrive. Szu Tai fights his way into Shaolin to get the Yijin manual but is defeated and held captive. Monk Dao Kong goes to apprehend Tao Hing but he is defeated again by Tao Hing. Tao Hing goes to rescue Wong Szu Tai and finds out about the corrupt Shaolin monks and helps Szu Tai to escape. They are almost successful but lose to the "18 Buddhas" until rescued by the 3 Holy Fools whose house arrest is about to expire and they also gave them the Yi Jin manual. Tao Hing goes with Wong Szu Tai to kill a puppet emperor but after meeting with him, Tao Hung realizes the puppet emperor is a good man. This cause a rift between him and Wong Szu Tai after Wong tries to kill the puppet emperor and Tao is forced to use the Yijin on Wong. An angered Wong departs until intercepted by "Fire Man" and "Water Man", however Tao Hing arrives, helps him defeat them and they make amends. They return to the Prime Minister's house but everyone is dead except the Prime Minister and Gu Long. Tao Hing kneels to help Gu Long and accidentally drops the royal seal which sparks the curiosity of Gu Long thus prompting him to say "we found him!" before he dies. Tao Hing and Wong Szu Tai realize they are brothers and go to Shaolin to defeat an awaiting 9th Prince. After the Prince is killed, Wong Szu Tai returns to the throne and Tao Hing becomes an elder monk at Shaolin with the 3 Holy Fools.

Cast 
 Ti Lung – Tao Hing/Dao Xing
 Derek Yee – Wong Szu Tai/Wang Zi Tai
 Jason Pai Piao – 9th Prince/Lord 9th/Iron fingers
 Yuen Wah - Li Chin/Li Zheng
 Chan Shen aka Alan Chan   - Abbot of Shaolin temple
 Yue Tau Wan   - holy fool monk Wu Li
 Yuen Bun – Water General/man
 Lam Fai Wong – holy fool monk Wu Ming
 Elvis Tsui aka Elvis Tsui Kam Kong  - Monk Wu Ren
Ku Feng  -	Prime Minister Wang
Alan Chan Kwok-Kuen  -	holy fool monk Wu Zhi
Lee Hoi-sang 	- 	Monk Dao Kong
Tong Gai 	- 	Chief of Lohan with two swords
Chiang Tao 	-	Fire General/man
Ngaai Fei 	- 	Emperor
Kwan Fung 	- 	Gu Long/Master Gu
Ku Kuan-Chung 	- 	Puppet Emperor
Chan Leung  	- 	Soldier in first attack
Wong Pau-Gei 	- 	General who attacks the palace
Cheung Kwok-Wah - 	9th Lord's Personal Guard
Lau Yuk-Pok 	- 	Xia Suqin
Shum Lo 	- 	Master Xia
Cheung Chok-Chow - 	Master Xia's servant
Wong Chi-Ming  - 	Soldier / Palace Guard / Monk
To Wai-Wo 	- 	Palace Guard
Lee Fat-Yuen 	- 	Palace Guard
Wong Chi-Wai  	- 	Guard Tu / Soldier
Yeung Chi-Hing - 	Innkeeper
Ma Hon-Yuen 	- 	Shaolin Lohan Monk / Shaolin Guardian
Lee Hang  	- 	Palace Guard / Monk
Lung Ying  	- 	Shaolin Guardian / Soldier  
Wong Wai-Tong 	- 	Shaolin Guardian / Monk present during the exorcism
Choi Kwok-Keung - 	Shaolin Guardian
Kong Chuen  	-	Soldier / Palace Guard / Shaolin Guardia
Wong Chi-Keung  - 	Soldier in 9th Lord's Army
Chui Fat 	- 	Soldier in 9th Lord's Army
Tam Bo 	- 	Soldier in 9th Lord's Army
Tam Wai-Man 	- 	Soldier in 9th Lord's Army
Tang Yuk-Wing 	- 	Soldier in 9th Lord's Army
San Kuai 	- 	Soldier in 9th Lord's Army
Chan Siu-Gai 	- 	Shaolin Lohan Monk / Monk
Ng Yuen-Fan  	- 	Monk
Stephen Chan Yung - 	Snr Monk
Fei Gin 	-	Soldier / Monk 
Ling Chi-Hung 	- 	Palace Guard / Lohan Monk
Ho Chi-Wai 	- 	Soldier / Monk 
Lam Foo-Wai 	- 	Soldier / Monk 
Chu Kong 	- 	Shaolin Lohan monk
Chan Ming-Wai 	- 	Shaolin Lohan monk
Jacky Yeung Tak-Ngai -	Shaolin Lohan monk
Kong Long  	-	Monk
Lam Tit-Ching 	- 	Prime Minister's servant
Lau Cheun 	- 	Prime Minister's servant
Au Chi-Hung 	- 	Monk
Wan Yiu-Cho 	- 	Soldier
Jeng Yee 	-	Shaolin monk
Chan Shiu-Wa 	- 	Shaolin monk

External links 

Hong Kong martial arts films
Kung fu films
1981 martial arts films
Shaw Brothers Studio films
1981 films
Funimation
1981 action films
1980s Hong Kong films